, also known as A Bad Boy Drinks Tea!, is a Japanese manga series written and illustrated by Hiroyuki Nishimori. It was serialized in Shogakukan's Weekly Shōnen Sunday from April 2007 to July 2009, with its chapters collected in eleven tankōbon volumes. A twelve-episode television drama adaptation premiered in Japan on Amazon Prime Video in March 2021 and premiered on TV Tokyo in October of the same year.

Plot
The story follows the high school delinquent Masaya Funabashi, better known as "Devil Ma-kun", who is trying to reform his image by joining the Japanese tea ceremony club.

Characters

Now a freshman in high school, "Devil Ma-kun" is hoping to reform his image after being labeled a delinquent in junior high due to his tough appearance, which caused him to get into a lot of fights. His explanation is that after winning one fight the losers comerades challenged him as well, and after their losses more and more people started challenging him to fights. While hoping to discard his bad image he tries to join a club, and chooses the tea club as it is the only one whose representatives are not to afraid to ask him.

Masaya's partner in crime. They've known one another since elementary school, and Wataru also has a reputation for being a troublemaker.

The head of the tea ceremony club, she is very open-minded and was quick to embrace Masaya's desire to reform his image.

Chika Iikura

Tamami Shindaiji

Tamiko Okunuma

Kōki Kashizawa

Kitanuma

Hiroshi Tatejima

Media

Manga
Ocha Nigosu, written and illustrated by Hiroyuki Nishimori, was serialized in Shogakukan's shōnen manga magazine Weekly Shōnen Sunday from April 4, 2007, to July 29, 2009. Shogakukan collected its chapters in eleven tankōbon volumes, released from August 10, 2007, to October 16, 2009.

Volume list

Drama
In December 2020, it was announced that a 12-episode Japanese television drama adaptation would premiere on TV Tokyo in 2021, starring Nobuyuki Suzuki as Masaya Funabashi. The twelve episodes first premiered on Amazon Prime Video on March 3, 2021. It was broadcast on TV Tokyo from October 8 to December 24, 2021.

Reception
Most of the Ocha Nigosu volumes were featured on Oricon's weekly chart of the best-selling manga; volume 5 debuted #10; volume 6 debuted #11 (68,773 copies sold); volume 7 debuted #14 (63,036 copies sold); volume 8 debuted #11 (48,435 copies sold); volume 9 debuted #14 (45,212 copies sold); volume 10 debuted #18 (54,372 copies sold); volume 11 debuted #17 (46,017 copies sold);

Notes

References

Further reading

External links
  
 

Comedy anime and manga
Shogakukan manga
Shōnen manga
TV Tokyo original programming
Yankī anime and manga